A. Eugene Washington (born 1951) is an American clinical investigator who is the Chancellor for Health Affairs and the President and chief executive officer of the Duke University Health System. His research considers gynaecology, health disparities and public health policy. He was elected to the National Academy of Medicine in 1997.

Early life and education 
Washington is from Houston. His father was a minister and his mother was a homemaker, and he was the youngest of five children. He grew up during segregation in the South of the United States. From an early age, Washington was dedicated to use his education to excel in public service. Washington eventually attended Howard University. He was a medical student at the University of California, San Francisco, and would later be celebrated as one of their most distinguished alumni. He joined the medical school at UCSF as a medical student in 1972, before completing his residency at Stanford University. Washington earned a master's degree in medicine at the Harvard T.H. Chan School of Public Health in 1978. Washington was a graduate student at the University of California, Berkeley, where he earned a Master of Public Health. After graduating he joined the Centers for Disease Control and Prevention.

Research and career 
In 1989 Washington joined the faculty at the University of California, San Francisco. In 1997 Washington was elected to the National Academy of Medicine, and later served on their governing council. He led several transformative projects at UCSF, including the implementation of a ten-point diversity initiative. His efforts to improve campus diversity were honoured with the Martin Luther King Jr. award in 2002. He established the Medical Effectiveness Research Centre for Diverse Populations, which looked to promote health and prevent disease in ethnically diverse populations. He worked with colleagues at Stanford University to lead an Evidence-Based Practise centre. Washington worked at the UCSF School of Medicine until 2009.

Washington was made Vice Chancellor and Dean at the David Geffen School of Medicine at UCLA in 2009. Here he worked as Professor of Gynaecology and Health Policy. He served as the founding chair of the Board of Governors of the Patient-Centered Outcomes Research Institute, which was authorised by the Affordable Care Act to research clinical effectiveness. The PCORI award 'Eugene Washington' legacy prizes each year, which distribute up to $25 million in recognition of Washington's efforts. His research considered medical technologies and the translation of health research into policy. Washington oversaw the creation of policy guidelines on cervical cancer and prenatal genetics. He joined Johnson & Johnson as a Director in 2012.

He was awarded the 2014 Association of American Medical Colleges David E. Rogers Award for his, “major contributions to improving the health and health care of the American people,”. That year he was also elected to the American Academy of Arts and Sciences.

In 2015 Washington was appointed to the Duke University Health System. Washington was awarded a UCSF medal in 2018.

Selected publications

Personal life 
Washington is married to Marie Washington, with whom he has three children.

References 

Living people
1951 births
Date of birth missing (living people)
American health care chief executives
Duke University staff
Members of the National Academy of Medicine
People from Houston
Howard University alumni
University of California, San Francisco alumni
Harvard School of Public Health alumni
University of California, Berkeley alumni
Centers for Disease Control and Prevention people
UCSF School of Medicine faculty
David Geffen School of Medicine at UCLA faculty
Johnson & Johnson people